Thomas Christian Römer (born 13 December 1955, in Mannheim) is a German-born Swiss biblical scholar, exegete, philologist, professor, and Reformed minister. After teaching at the University of Geneva, he became professor of the Old Testament at the University of Lausanne. From 2007, has held the chair "Biblical environments" at the Collège de France, of which he became administrator in 2019. The Collège de France is considered to be France's most prestigious research establishment.

Biography

Life 
Thomas Römer, born 13 December 1955 in Mannheim (Germany) and raised in a practicing Protestant family of German descent, was very passionate about the Old Testament, intrigued in particular by its paradoxes. Without any particular vocation and like what was regularly practiced in Germany, he headed for Theology. From 1982 to 1984, He was trainee minister of the Reformed Church of France in Nancy.

Education 
He studied Theology and Religious studies at the theological faculties of the University of Heidelberg and University of Tübingen from 1974 to 1980. He also studied Biblical Hebrew, Ugaritic, and other Semitic languages notably under the direction of Rolf Rendtorff, professor of Old Testament in Heidelberg, who encourages him to develop a thesis on the question of the Jewish Patriarchs in the Book of Deuteronomy and the Deuteronomist history. 
From 1980 to 1982, Römer studied Religious studies at the École pratique des hautes études in Paris. During his preparation in Paris, where he arrived in 1980, he attended the École pratique des hautes études, the Catholic Institute of Paris, and the Protestant Faculty of Theology in Paris - where his teacher was the exegete Françoise Florentin-Smyth - and obtained his doctorate in 1988.

Doctoral thesis 
His doctoral thesis entitled Israels Väter combines structuralist and historico-critical approaches, and is part of the continuation of the work of John Van Seters. It postulates the controversial aim of the editors of Deuteronomy against certain Judean circles and that the Pentateuch is the result of an attempt to unify between two factions internal to post-Babylonian exile, split between the exiles returning from Babylon and the Jews who remained in the country and whose visions are expressed respectively through the tradition of the Jewish Patriarchs and that of the Exodus. This thesis innovates in particular by suggesting that the fathers mentioned in Deuteronomy are those of the Exodus and not the Patriarchs, that the Deuteronomist editor considers that the only and true Israel is in the Golah, that is to say the exiles Babylonians, and that the patriarchs Abraham, Isaac, and Jacob did not appear in Deuteronomy until the final writing and editing of the Pentateuch.

Academic work

University of Geneva 
From 1984 to 1989, Römer was a research assistant of Albert de Pury in the Old Testament at the Faculty of Theology of the University of Geneva, and lecturer of Biblical Hebrew and Ugaritic. At the invitation of Albert de Pury, met in Paris, Thomas Römer joined the University of Geneva where he became senior lecturer at the Faculty of Theology from 1989 to 1991, before he became assistant professor teaching biblical philology and biblical exegesis from 1991 until 1993.

University of Lausanne 
Since 1993, he was professor of Biblical Hebrew at the faculty of theology and science of religions in the University of Lausanne, as well as at the Institut romand des sciences bibliques (IRSB) 12 which was attached to him. In 2003, he was contacted by French authorities, when Jacques Chirac tried to clarify George W. Bush's allusions to the biblical prophecies on "Gog and Magog" a few weeks before the invasion of Iraq, to which he gave a biblical note on this apocalyptic prophecy.

Collège de France 
In 2007, at the invitation of the assyriologist Jean-Marie Durand, Thomas Römer was appointed professor at the Collège de France where he held the chair "Milieux Bibliques": it was the first time that the term "Bible" appeared in a title of a research program of the College de France.

Since 2013, he has directed the UMR 7192 "Near East-Caucasus: languages, archeology, cultures". Became vice-president of the assembly of professors of the College de France in 2015, he was elected the following year a foreign associate of the Académie des Inscriptions et Belles-Lettres, in the chair of the medievalist Peter Lewis.

His work has contributed to deeply renewing the understanding of the formation and dating of the Pentateuch as well as of the constitution of Jewish traditions on Abraham and Moses in particular. Thus, his work The So-Called Deuteronomistic History, published in English in 2005 and translated into several languages, marks a milestone in the history of Deuteronomist research. In January 2019, he made the cover of the popular science journal for the general public Sciences et Avenir for his philological and archaeological work on the Ark of the Covenant and his participation in excavations at the archaeological site of Kiriath Yearim (near Abu Gosh in Israel).

From 2015 to 2019, Römer was Vice-President of the Assembly of Professors of the Collège de France. On 1 September 2019 he was appointed administrator of the Collège de France, succeeding Alain Prochiantz. Of German and Swiss nationality, he became the first foreigner to head the Collège de France.

Historical-critical approach 
Thomas Römer adopts an academic approach which combines historical criticism, literary and philological analysis of Old Testament texts, sometimes supported by archeology, seeking to detect the social, political or cultural circumstances which are the framework of the religious thought they generate, regardless of impact or contemporary theological readings. He notes that the writing of biblical texts constitutes a form of synthesis between identity conceptions and quite different theological conceptions and believes that this approach, which sometimes clashes with traditional representations, can serve both atheists and believers in their reflections on current issues.

Editorial work 
The Society of Biblical Literature Press, Ancient Israel and Its Literature (AIL) editorial board is led by series editor Thomas C. Römer.

Honours and awards

Honours
 2019 : Knight of the Legion of Honour.
 2022 : Commander of the Ordre des Arts et des Lettres.

Awards
 2014 : Prize for the history of religions of the Foundation Les amis de Pierre-Antoine Bernheim of the Académie des Inscriptions et Belles-Lettres.
 2015 : Leenaards Foundation Cultural Prize.

Honorary degrees
 2015 : Tel Aviv University.
 2022 : Catholic University of Lyon.

Publications 
Bibliography (1984-2016): IRSB Publications.

Thomas Römer et Jean-Daniel Macchi, Guide de la Bible hébraïque: La critique textuelle dans la Biblia Hebraica Stuttgartensia (BHS), Genève, Labor et Fides, 1994
Thomas Römer, Dieu obscur: Le sexe, la cruauté et la violence dans l’Ancien Testament, Genève, Labor et Fides, coll. « Essais Bibliques » (no 27), 1998 (1re éd. 1996)
Thomas Römer, Le peuple élu et les autres: L’Ancien Testament entre exclusion et ouverture, Poliez-le-Grand, Éditions du Moulin, 1997
Thomas Römer, Les chemins de la sagesse: Proverbes, Job, Qohéleth, Poliez-le-Grand, Éditions du Moulin, 1999
Thomas Römer, Moïse « lui que Yahvé a connu face à face », Paris, Gallimard, coll. « Découvertes Gallimard / Religions » (no 424), 2002
Thomas Römer, Jérémie: Du prophète au livre, Poliez-le-Grand, Éditions du Moulin, 2003
Thomas Römer et Loyse Bonjour, L'homosexualité dans le Proche-Orient ancien et la Bible, Genève, Labor et Fides, coll. « Essais bibliques » (no 37), 2005

Thomas Römer (trans. F. Smyth), La première histoire d'Israël: L'École deutéronomiste à l'œuvre, Genève, Labor et Fides, coll. « Le Monde de la Bible » (no 56), 2007
Thomas Römer, Psaumes interdits, Aubonne, Éditions du Moulin, 2007

Thomas Römer, Jean-Marie Durand et Jean-Pierre Mahé, La faute et sa punition dans les sociétés orientales, Leuven, Peeters, 2013

Thomas Römer, L’Invention de Dieu, Paris, Seuil, coll. « Les Livres du nouveau monde », 2014
Thomas Römer, La Bible, quelles histoires!: Les dernières découvertes, les dernières hypothèses, Genève, Labor et Fides, 2014
Thomas Römer, Moïse en version originale: Enquête sur le récit de la sortie d’Égypte, Bayard/Labor et Fides, 2015
Thomas Römer et Léonie Bischoff, Naissance de la Bible: comment elle a été écrite, Bruxelles, Le Lombard, coll. « La Petite Bédéthèque des savoirs » (no 23), 2018
Thomas Römer et Israël Finkelstein, Aux origines de la Torah: Nouvelles rencontres, nouvelles perspectives, Bayard, 2019

References

Bibliography 

1955 births
20th-century Calvinist and Reformed ministers
20th-century Calvinist and Reformed theologians
20th-century Christian biblical scholars
20th-century Swiss educators
20th-century Swiss non-fiction writers
21st-century Calvinist and Reformed ministers
21st-century Calvinist and Reformed theologians
21st-century Christian biblical scholars
21st-century Swiss educators
21st-century Swiss non-fiction writers
Calvinist and Reformed biblical scholars
Clergy from Mannheim
Academic staff of the Collège de France
German emigrants to Switzerland
Heidelberg University alumni
Living people
Members of the Académie des Inscriptions et Belles-Lettres
Old Testament scholars
Swiss biblical scholars
Swiss Calvinist and Reformed ministers
Swiss Calvinist and Reformed theologians
Swiss religion academics
Academic staff of the University of Geneva
Academic staff of the University of Lausanne
University of Paris alumni
Writers from Mannheim